Mohamed Kacimi (born 1955) is an Algerian novelist and playwright.

Early life
Mohamed Kacimi was born in 1955 in El Hamel, French Algeria. He was raised as a Muslim, and he attended both French and Islamic schools as Zawiyet El Hamel. He emigrated to France in 1981, settling in Paris.

Career
Kacimi is the author of several novels, plays and non-fiction books. His first novel, Le mouchoir, was turned down fourteen times before it was published by L'Harmattan in 1987. His 2006 play, Terre sainte, received a good review from Le Figaro when it was performed in Avignon in 2013. Meanwhile, Kacimi also worked as a translator and a ghostwriter. He was also a contributor to Actuel, a French magazine, and he produced Les Chemins de la connaissance on France Culture. 
In 2005, he was, with others authors such as Alain Decaux, Richard Millet and Jean-Pierre Thiollet, one of the Beirut Book Fair's guests in the Beirut International Exhibition & Leisure Center, commonly (BIEL).

Kacimi is a critic of Al Jazeera. In the wake of the Charlie Hebdo shooting of 7 January 2015, he wrote a Facebook post relating remarks voiced by teenagers from Val-de-Marne against Charlie Hebdo; however, he was unable to explain where he had heard them specifically, leading Marianne and other media outlets to wonder if he had made them up.

Works

Novels

Plays

Non-fiction

References

Living people
1955 births
People from M'Sila Province
Writers from Paris
Algerian novelists
Algerian dramatists and playwrights
Algerian emigrants to France
Algerian Muslims